Leonhard "Leo" Peukert (26 August 1885 – 6 January 1944) was a prolific German film actor and film director, appearing in more than a hundred and fifty productions between 1910 and his death in 1944. While occasionally he played a leading role in his early years, such as the comedy The Happy Journey (1924), he mostly appeared as a character actor. Peukert was also a film director, making eleven short and feature films during the silent era.

He was married to the actress Sabine Impekoven who appeared with him in several silent films.

Selected filmography
 Poor Jenny (1912)
 My Leopold (1914)
 My Leopold (1919)
 The Love of Marion Bach (1919)
 King Krause (1919)
 Hasemann's Daughters (1920)
 My Leopold (1924)
 The Happy Journey (1924)
 The Second Mother (1925)
 Radio Magic (1927)
 Two Under the Stars (1927)
 I Stand in the Dark Midnight (1927)
 Mikosch Comes In (1928)
 Autumn on the Rhine (1928)
 Escape from Hell (1928)
 A Better Master (1928)
 Almenrausch and Edelweiss (1928)
 Beware of Loose Women (1929)
 The Lord of the Tax Office (1929)
 I Once Had a Beautiful Homeland (1928)
 The Convict from Istanbul (1929)
 Scandal in Baden-Baden (1929)
 Three Days Confined to Barracks (1930)
 Kohlhiesel's Daughters (1930)
 The Son of the White Mountain (1930)
 Moritz Makes his Fortune (1931)
 My Friend the Millionaire (1932)
 The Testament of Cornelius Gulden (1932)
 Happy Days in Aranjuez (1933)
 A Woman Who Knows What She Wants (1934)
 At the Strasbourg (1934)
 Gypsy Blood (1934)
 The Four Musketeers (1934)
 All Because of the Dog (1935)
 Paul and Pauline (1936)
 Orders Are Orders (1936)
 Diamonds (1937)
 My Son the Minister (1937)
 Gordian the Tyrant (1937)
 Meiseken (1937)
 The Vagabonds (1937)
 Between the Parents (1938)
 The Roundabouts of Handsome Karl (1938)
The Secret Lie (1938)
 The Deruga Case (1938)
 A Hopeless Case (1939)
 Central Rio (1939)
 Hotel Sacher (1939)
 The Scoundrel (1939)
 My Aunt, Your Aunt (1939)
 Kora Terry (1940)
 Between Hamburg and Haiti (1940)
 Counterfeiters (1940)
 Left of the Isar, Right of the Spree (1940)
 Women Are Better Diplomats (1941)
 Quax the Crash Pilot (1941)
 Doctor Crippen (1942)
 Diesel (1942)
 The Thing About Styx (1942)
 Mask in Blue (1943)
 Back Then (1943)
 Beloved Darling (1943)
 Romance in a Minor Key (1943)
 Kohlhiesel's Daughters (1943)
 Tonelli (1943)

References

Bibliography 
 Grange, William. Cultural Chronicle of the Weimar Republic. Scarecrow Press, 2008.

External links 
 

1885 births
1944 deaths
German male stage actors
German male film actors
German male silent film actors
Male actors from Munich
20th-century German male actors
Burials at Munich Waldfriedhof